George Alan Prescott (17 June 1927 – 20 September 1998) was an English rugby league footballer who played in the 1940s, 1950s and 1960s, and coached in the 1960s. In 404 matches for St Helens. Prescott scored 31 tries for a total of 93 points. He played 14 times for Lancashire, 12 times for England, once for Rugby League XIII, once for British Empire, and made 31 Great Britain appearances (10 as captain).

Background
Prescott was born in Widnes, Lancashire, England, and he died aged 71 in Wigan, Greater Manchester, England

Playing career

He was transferred from Halifax to St. Helens on 11 January 1949 and he made his first team début four days later against Belle Vue Rangers. Prescott was captain and Lance Todd Trophy winner at Wembley in 1956.

His test début against Australia was at Headingley in 1952. When he arrived in Australia as captain of Great Britain in 1956, he had not missed a Test against Australia since making his début. He is best remembered for leading his side to victory over Australia at Brisbane in 1958, having broken his arm after just four minutes but continuing to play. The match became known as "Prescott’s Match" or the "Battle of Brisbane".

Alan Prescott represented Great Britain & France in the 37–31 victory over New Zealand at Carlaw Park, Auckland on 3 July 1957.

His final appearance for St. Helens was against Halifax on 19 March 1960. He took over from Jim Sullivan as St. Helens' coach. Alan coached St. Helens to Lancashire County Cup success and a Challenge Cup win over Wigan in 1961.

International honours
Alan Prescott also represented Great Britain while at St. Helens between 1952 and 1956 against France (3 non-Test matches).

Challenge Cup Final appearances
Alan Prescott played left-, i.e. number 8, in St. Helens' 10-15 defeat by Huddersfield in the 1953 Challenge Cup Final during the 1952-53 season at Wembley Stadium, London on Saturday 25 April 1953, in front of a crowd of 89,588, and played left-, and was man of the match winning the Lance Todd Trophy in the 13-2 victory over Halifax in the 1956 Challenge Cup Final during the 1955–56 season at Wembley Stadium, London on Saturday 28 April 1956, in front of a crowd of 79,341.

County Cup Final appearances
Alan Prescott played left-, i.e. number 8, in St. Helens' 5-22 defeat by Leigh in the 1952 Lancashire County Cup Final during the 1952–53 season at Station Road, Swinton on Saturday 29 November 1952, played left- in the 16-8 victory over Wigan in the 1953 Lancashire County Cup Final during the 1953–54 season at Station Road, Swinton on Saturday 24 October 1953, played left- in the 3-10 defeat by Oldham in the 1956 Lancashire County Cup Final during the 1956–57 season at Central Park, Wigan on Saturday 20 October 1956, and played right-, i.e. number 10, in the 5-4 defeat by Warrington in the 1959 Lancashire County Cup Final during the 1959–60 season at Central Park, Wigan Saturday 31 October 1959.

Coaching career

Challenge Cup Final appearances
Alan Prescott was the coach in St. Helens 12-6 victory over Wigan in the 1961 Challenge Cup Final during the 1960–61 season at Wembley Stadium, London on Saturday 13 May 1961, in front of a crowd of 94,672.

References

External links
Alan Prescott at eraofthebiff.com
(archived by web.archive.org) Alan Prescott at rlhalloffame.org.uk
Profile at saints.org.uk
(archived by archive.is) U.K. League Hooker in Doubt
Obituary: Alan Prescott

1927 births
1998 deaths
British Empire rugby league team players
England national rugby league team players
English rugby league coaches
English rugby league players
Great Britain & France rugby league team players
Great Britain national rugby league team captains
Great Britain national rugby league team players
Halifax R.L.F.C. players
Lancashire rugby league team players
Lance Todd Trophy winners
Leigh Leopards coaches
Rugby league locks
Rugby league players from Widnes
Rugby league props
Rugby league second-rows
Rugby league utility players
Rugby league wingers
St Helens R.F.C. captains
St Helens R.F.C. coaches
St Helens R.F.C. players